EVgo is an electric vehicle DC fast charging station network in the United States, with more than 850 charging locations . The company's charge stations are located in 34 states and are compatible with all major auto manufacturers. In July 2021, EVgo acquired Recargo, the California company behind the popular PlugShare EV charger locator, for $25M. In June 2022, the company announced a partnership with General Motors to expand compatibility and access for GM vehicles. In January 2023, at the annual CES tech trade show, EVgo announced a partnership with online retail giant Amazon to allow drivers with Alexa-equipped cars to locate, schedule and pay for charging using Alexa, with a planned roll-out later in 2023.

History
EVgo originally started in 2010 as a clean energy push for regulatory compliance at NRG Energy. By 2016, EVgo was sold to investment group Vision Ridge Partners, and then again, starting in 2019, to LS Power.

See also
Charging station
Electric vehicle network

References

External links

 EVgo

Charging stations
Electric vehicle infrastructure developers
Companies based in Los Angeles
Technology companies based in California
American companies established in 2010
Companies listed on the Nasdaq